William Woodin may refer to:
 William H. Woodin (1868–1934), U.S. industrialist
 William B. Woodin (1824–1893), American lawyer and politician from New York
 W. Hugh Woodin (born 1955), American mathematician